This is a list of all the New Democratic Party members who have served in the Parliament of Canada. Members who are currently serving in the 43rd Canadian Parliament are listed in bold.



A
Malcolm Allen (2008–2015)
Vic Althouse (1980–1997)
Douglas Anguish (1980–1984)
Charlie Angus (2004–present)
Iain Angus (1984–1993)
Hazen Argue (1961–1962)
Niki Ashton (2008–present)
Alex Atamanenko (2006–2015)
Robert Aubin (2011–2019)
Chris Axworthy (1988–1999)
Paulina Ayala (2011–2015)

B
Taylor Bachrach (2019–present)
Dave Barrett (1988–1993)
Thomas Barnett (1962–1968, 1969–1974)
Catherine Bell (2006–2008)
Les Benjamin (1968–1993)
Tyrone Benskin (2011–2015)
Sheri Benson (2015–2019)
Thomas Berger (1962–1963)
Dennis Bevington (2006–2015)
Dawn Black (1988–1993, 2006–2009)
Derek Blackburn (1971–1993)
Bill Blaikie (1979–2008)
Daniel Blaikie (2015–present)
Denis Blanchette (2011–2015)
Lysane Blanchette-Lamothe (2011–2015)
Rachel Blaney (2015–present)
Françoise Boivin (2011–2015)
Charmaine Borg (2011–2015)
Alexandre Boulerice (2011–present)
Marjolaine Boutin-Sweet (2011–2019)
Tarik Brahmi (2011–2015)
Michael Breaugh (1990–1993)
Andrew Brewin (1962–1979)
John Brewin (1988–1993)
Ed Broadbent (1968–1989, 2004–2006)
Ruth Ellen Brosseau (2011–2019)
John Burton (1968–1972)
Steve Butland (1988–1993)

C
Colin Cameron (1962–1968)
Richard Cannings (2015–present)
Guy Caron (2011–2019)
Andrew Cash (2011–2015)
Michael Cassidy (1984–1988)
Chris Charlton (2006–2015)
Sylvain Chicoine (2011-2015)
Robert Chisholm (2011–2015)
François Choquette (2011–2019)
David Christopherson (2004–2019)
Olivia Chow (2006–2014)
Ryan Cleary (2011–2015)
Joe Comartin (2000–2015)
Laurel Collins (2019–present)
Raymond Côté (2011–2015)
Jean Crowder (2004–2015)
Nathan Cullen (2004–2019)

D
Don Davies (2008–present)
Libby Davies (1997–2015)
Anne-Marie Day (2011-2015)
Simon De Jong (1979–1997)
Ian Deans (1980–1986)
Bev Desjarlais (1997–2005)
Marion Dewar (1987–1988)
Paul Dewar (2006–2015)
Pierre Dionne Labelle (2011–2015)
Michelle Dockrill (1997–2000)
Fin Donnelly (2009–2019)
Rosane Doré Lefebvre (2011–2015)
Tommy Douglas (1962–1968, 1969–1979)
Matthew Dubé (2011–2019)
Linda Duncan (2008–2019)
Pierre-Luc Dusseault (2011–2019)
Scott Duvall (2015–2021)

E
Gordon Earle (1997–2000)
Phil Edmonston (1990–1993)
Ernie Epp (1984–1988)

F
Fonse Faour (1978–1979)
Norman Fawcett (1966–1968)
Wally Firth (1973–1979)
Douglas Fisher (1961–1965)
Ron Fisher (1988–1993)
Mylène Freeman (2011–2015)
James Fulton (1979–1993)
Raymond Funk (1988–1993)

G
Brian Gardiner (1988–1993)
Randall Garrison (2011–present)
Leah Gazan (2019–present)
Réjean Genest (2011-2015)
Jonathan Genest-Jourdain (2011–2015)
Bud Germa (1967–1968)
Alain Giguère (2011–2015)
John Gilbert (1966–1978)
Alfred Gleave (1968–1974)
Yvon Godin (1997–2015)
Claude Gravelle (2008–2015)
Matthew Green (2019–present)
Sadia Groguhé (2011–2015)
Terry Grier (1973–1974)
Dennis Gruending (1999–2000)

H
Cheryl Hardcastle (2015–2019)
Randolph Harding (1968–1974)
Louise Hardy (1997–2000)
John Paul Harney (1973–1974)
Dan Harris (2011–2015)
Jack Harris (1987–1988, 2008–2015, 2019–2021)
Ross Harvey (1988–1993)
Sana Hassainia (2011–2015)
Dan Heap (1981–1993)
Herbert Herridge (1961–1968)
Andrew Hogan (1974–1979)
Stan Hovdebo (1979–1993)
Frank Howard (1961–1974)
William Howe (1963–1968)
Carol Hughes (2008–present)
Lynn Hunter (1988–1993)
Bruce Hyer (2008–2012)

I
Peter Ittinuar (1979–1982)

J
Pierre Jacob (2011–2015)
Pauline Jewett (1979–1988)
Gord Johns (2015–present)
Georgina Jolibois (2015–2019)
Peter Julian (2004–present)

K
Jim Karpoff (1988–1993)
Cyril Keeper (1980–1988)
Matthew Kellway (2011–2015)
William Knight (1971–1974)
Stanley Knowles (1962–1984)
Lyle Kristiansen (1980–1984, 1988–1993)
Jenny Kwan (2015–present)

L
Rick Laliberte (1997–2000)
Joy Langan (1988–1993)
Steven W. Langdon (1984–1993)
François Lapointe (2011–2015)
Rod Laporte (1988–1993)
Jean-François Larose (2011–2014)
Alexandrine Latendresse (2011–2015)
Hélène Laverdière (2011–2019)
Jack Layton (2004–2011)
Hélène LeBlanc (2011–2015)
Stuart Leggatt (1973–1979)
Megan Leslie (2008–2015)
David Lewis (1962–1963, 1966–1974)
Laverne Lewycky (1980–1984)
Wendy Lill (1997–2004)
Laurin Liu (2011–2015)

M
Alistair MacGregor (2015–present)
Grace MacInnis (1966–1974)
Malcolm MacInnis (1962–1963)
Lyle MacWilliam (1988–1993)
Hoang Mai (2011–2015)
Sheila Malcolmson (2015–2019)
Jim Maloway (2008–2011)
Peter Mancini (1997–2000)
James Manly (1980–1988)
Murdo Martin (1961–1968)
Pat Martin (1997–2015)
Tony Martin (2004–2011)
Wayne Marston (2006–2015)
Brian Masse (2002–present)
Barry Mather (1962–1974)
Irene Mathyssen (2006–2019)
Lindsay Mathyssen (2019–present)
Howard McCurdy (1984–1993)
Lynn McDonald (1982–1988)
Alexa McDonough (1997–2008)
Audrey McLaughlin (1987–1997)
Heather McPherson (2019–present)
Élaine Michaud (2011–2015)
Edward Miller (1979–1984)
Margaret Mitchell (1979–1993)
Christine Moore (2011–2019)
Dany Morin (2011–2015)
Isabelle Morin (2011–2015)
Marc-André Morin (2011–2015)
Marie-Claude Morin (2011–2015)
Thomas Mulcair (2007–2018)
Rodney Murphy (1979–1993)

N
Pierre Nantel (2011–2019; removed from NDP caucus following revelations he was in talks about joining another party)
Peggy Nash (2006–2008, 2011–2015)
Paddy Neale (1973–1974)
Nels Nelson (1973–1974)
Eli Nesdoly (1973–1974)
Jamie Nicholls (2011–2015)
José Nunez-Melo (2011–2015)
Lorne Nystrom (1968–1993, 1997–2004)

O
Robert Ogle (1979–1984)
Harry Olaussen (1973–1974)
David Orlikow (1962–1988)

P
Annick Papillon (2011–2015)
Sid Parker (1980–1984, 1988–1993)
John Parry (1984–1988)
Claude Patry (2011–2013; crossed the floor to the Bloc Québécois)
Ève Péclet (2011–2015)
Manon Perreault (2011–2014)
Arnold Peters (1961–1979)
François Pilon (2011–2015)
Walter Pitman (1960–1962)
Penny Priddy (2006–2008)
Robert Prittie (1962–1968)
Dick Proctor (1997–2004)

Q
Mumilaaq Qaqqaq (2019–present)
Anne Minh-Thu Quach (2011–2019)

R
Bob Rae (1978–1982)
John Rafferty (2008–2015)
Tracey Ramsey (2015–2019)
Murray Rankin (2012–2019)
Mathieu Ravignat (2011–2015)
Francine Raynault (2011–2015)
Erhart Regier (1961–1962)
Nelson Riis (1980–2000)
Svend Robinson (1979–2004)
John Rodriguez (1973–1979, 1984–1993)
Mark Rose (1968–1974, 1979–1983)
Jean Rousseau (2011–2015)
Doug Rowland (1970–1974)

S
Roméo Saganash (2011–2019)
Lise St-Denis (2011–2012; crossed the floor to the Liberals)
Max Saltsman (1964–1979)
Cid Samson (1988–1993)
Jasbir Sandhu (2011–2015)
Brigitte Sansoucy (2015–2019)
Terry Sargeant (1979–1984)
Denise Savoie (2006–2012)
Edward Schreyer (1966–1969)
Craig Scott (2012–2015)
Reid Scott (1962–1968)
Djaouida Sellah (2011–2015)
Bill Siksay (2004–2011)
Jinny Sims (2011–2015)
Jagmeet Singh (2019–present)
Rathika Sitsabaiesan (2011–2015)
Raymond Skelly (1979–1993)
Robert Skelly (1988–1993)
John Skoberg (1968–1972)
John Solomon (1994–2000)
Wayne Stetski (2015–2019)
Kennedy Stewart (2011–2018)
Peter Stoffer (1997–2015)
David Stupich (1988–1993)
Mike Sullivan (2011–2015)
Cyril Symes (1973–1979)

T
Len Taylor (1988–1997)
Glenn Thibeault (2008–2014)
Rod Thomson (1968–1972)
Philip Toone (2011–2015)
Robert Toupin (1986–1987)
Jonathan Tremblay (2011–2015)
Karine Trudel (2015–2019)
Nycole Turmel (2011–2015)

V
Angela Vautour (1997–1999)

W
Ian Waddell (1979–1993)
Judy Wasylycia-Leis (1997–2010)
Arnold Webster (1962–1965)
Erin Weir (2015–2018; expelled from the NDP caucus following a sexual harassment investigation)
Jack Whittaker (1988–1993)
Harold Winch (1961–1972)

Y
Neil Young (1980–1993)

See also
List of articles about CCF/NDP members (by year first elected)
List of NDP members of provincial and territorial assemblies

 
New Democratic Party